WGTW-TV (channel 48) is a religious television station licensed to Millville, New Jersey, United States, owned and operated by the Trinity Broadcasting Network (TBN). It previously served the Philadelphia, Pennsylvania television market, but can now only be received in Southern New Jersey. The station's studios are located on Columbia Avenue in suburban Folcroft, Pennsylvania; its transmitter was previously located in the Roxborough section of Philadelphia, but is now shared with True Crime Network affiliate WMGM-TV (channel 40) along Avalon Boulevard in the Swainton section of Middle Township, east of the Garden State Parkway off Exit 13.

History

Prior use of channel 48 in Burlington, New Jersey

The channel 48 allocation, which had been located at Burlington, New Jersey, until 2017, was first occupied by WKBS-TV, an independent station that broadcast from September 1965 to August 1983. For years, WKBS-TV was a popular independent station, but began to lose market share to WTAF-TV (now WTXF-TV) and WPHL-TV by the early 1980s. WKBS owner Field Communications, which was in the process of being broken up due to disagreements among its controlling family, could not find a buyer and opted to surrender the station's license and liquidate the station's assets in lieu of selling WKBS-TV as a going concern, even though it still turned a profit.

A new 48
With WKBS-TV having surrendered its license, the doors were open for applicants to file to build a new station on the channel. The major-market allocation attracted intense interest, with the Federal Communications Commission (FCC) designating 11 bids for comparative hearing in 1984. Bidders included Cornerstone Television, a Christian broadcaster from Pittsburgh; Dorothy Brunson, a Black radio executive and station owner; and BCT Communications, which included former CBS president Arthur R. Taylor. The Spanish International Network, which also applied, was ruled to already be at the FCC's seven-station limit.

By the time the hearing began in October, the field had thinned to seven, which had attempted to reach a settlement but failed in doing so. The independent market also rapidly shifted, with the relaunch of two stations while hearing was underway: WGBS-TV and WSJT. This prompted two bidders—BCT and Burlington TV—to take an offer from competing Adelphi Broadcasting, a women-owned firm, and drop out in late 1985.

While Adelphi was seen as the frontrunner, FCC administrative law judge Joseph Chachkin disagreed. Calling its corporate structure "clearly a sham" for the way Black ownership interests were structured—and dismissing another applicant on similar grounds—he selected the Brunson application in February 1986. Brunson committed to selling her three radio stations to move to Burlington and build channel 48. Meanwhile, Cornerstone—having already purchased channel 48's transmitter—moved it to Altoona and used it to sign on a new station in 1985 on channel 47—also known as WKBS-TV.

Years of court challenges to the Brunson grant held up the establishment of her station until the Supreme Court of the United States refused to take up the challenge in 1990, at which time she was granted the permit and sold the radio stations. With the call letters WGTW-TV, channel 48 signed on August 13, 1992. Initially the station ran public domain movies, infomercials (including religious programs), and home-shopping programs. By 1994, WGTW had a larger variety of programming, including off-network series, first-run syndicated shows, and children's programs. The station also aired NBC daytime programs that were preempted by then-affiliate KYW-TV (channel 3).

Sale to TBN

By 2001, however, WGTW found its programming choices significantly reduced. All six network affiliates in the market were now owned and operated by their respective networks and hence rarely preempted network programming. In addition to the rise of UPN and The WB locally on WPSG and WPHL-TV, the non-talk and court show programming on the syndication market significantly dwindled. There simply wasn't enough programming to go around, even for a market as large as Philadelphia. It was also hamstrung by financial issues, resulting in the station filling most of its broadcast day with paid programming to maintain operations.

In 2004, TBN was looking to acquire stations in major markets as part of a larger strategy of purchasing full-power stations to acquire compulsory must-carry carriage on that market's cable systems. TBN offered to purchase WGTW from Brunson, an offer that was accepted. On October 1, 2004, the sale was closed and TBN took over all operations of the station. Since then, WGTW has mostly been a simulcast of the TBN national feed. However, it aired two hours of weekly locally-originated programming after the sale for more than a decade: a public affairs show called Joy in Our Town and a local version of Praise the Lord, TBN's flagship show. These programs were recorded at WGTW's studio facilities in Folcroft, north of Philadelphia International Airport across Darby Creek. As of 2017, this programming was cancelled.

News operation
In 2002, WGTW launched an hour-long news and public affairs show, called 48 Update, which aired weeknights at 7:00 p.m. The final edition of 48 Update aired on October 1, 2004, one hour before the station switched to TBN programming.

Technical information

Subchannels
This station's digital signal, unlike most other full-service TBN owned-and-operated stations, carries four instead of five different TBN-run networks since it is under a channel sharing agreement.

Analog-to-digital conversion 
TBN-owned full-power stations permanently ceased analog transmissions on April 16, 2009.

Broadcast incentive auction
Trinity Broadcasting entered WGTW-TV’s broadcast frequency into the FCC's spectrum auction, the results of which were released in April 2017. TBN received $80,807,689 for WGTW-TV's spectrum and as a result, the station relinquished its RF channel 27 frequency and move to channel 36, where it will enter a channel-sharing arrangement with WMGM-TV, licensed to Wildwood, New Jersey. TBN additionally requested to have WGTW's community of license moved from Burlington to Millville, New Jersey, as WMGM-TV's transmitter location near Avalon, New Jersey would leave WGTW unable to service Burlington with a significantly viewable over-the-air signal. The move of WGTW's transmitter to Avalon from its original location in Roxborough significantly reduced the station's signal in Philadelphia and most of the Delaware Valley viewing area. The FCC approved the license move from Burlington to Millville on September 26, 2017.

References

External links
TBN website

Trinity Broadcasting Network affiliates
Television channels and stations established in 1992
1992 establishments in New Jersey
GTW-TV
GTW-TV
GTW-TV